Secular paganism or humanistic paganism is an outlook which upholds virtues and principles associated with paganism while maintaining a secular worldview. Approaches to secular paganism vary, but can include the respect for living creatures and the Earth itself, while rejecting belief in deities. Secular pagans may recognize goddesses/gods as useful metaphors for different cycles of life, or reframe magic as a purely psychological practice.

Historical background
As Europe was Christianized, the Church Fathers regularly secularized pagan deities and myths through euhemerism, a practice where the deities are interpreted as historical figures who at some point had become worshiped as gods. Clement of Alexandria summarized the approach in Cohortatio ad gentes, addressing the pagans: "Those to whom you bow were once men like yourselves."

The 18th century produced a considerable body of works that sought to "unveil" concepts from the ancient world, including the pagan gods. This gave birth to rationalist and atheist interpretations of ancient mythological concepts, and ancient texts were sometimes read as if they were written by contemporaries to the Enlightenment philosophers, discussing the same topics as they from the same humanist perspective.

Neopaganism
Some adherents of modern Paganism have developed humanistic or secular approaches, where important aspects of a pagan worldview are embraced, but deities are not revered as real or supernatural beings. These approaches take on a variety of different forms.

In the 19th century, the French writer Louis Ménard used the term "mystical paganism" for his attempt to create a substitute for organized religion, in which he used a humanistic approach to recognize the importance of symbols and the irrational. The concept had significant influence on the poet Leconte de Lisle and the Parnassian movement.

Some pagan revivalists are inspired by Carl Jung's theories about archetypes and the collective unconscious. Jung handled esoteric and mythological subjects in a secular and scientific, yet not dismissive manner.

The biologist Andreas Weber promotes what he calls "poetic ecology" and "poetic materialism". This has been a source of inspiration for people such as Henrik Hallgren of the Swedish Forn Sed Assembly.

Godless Paganism: Voices of Non-Theistic Pagans, an American anthology edited by John Halstead, was published in 2016 and contains a number of essays on secular approaches to paganism. Atheopaganism: An Earth-Honoring Path Rooted in Science was published in 2019 by Mark Green and presents a methodology, rationale, set of values and practices for a denomination of naturalistic paganism.

Political theology
In the context of political theology, the philosopher Odo Marquard has argued that the separation of powers is a "disenchanted return of polytheism". His 1979 essay on the subject, "In Praise of Polytheism", provoked controversy among German scholars. Contrary to Marquard, the philosopher Jacob Taubes—who defended a secularized version of apocalyptic eschatology—argued that the secularized, political version of paganism is totalitarianism.

See also 
Covenant of Unitarian Universalist Pagans
Crypto-paganism
Cultural Christians, Cultural Judaism, and Cultural Muslims
Naturalistic pantheism
Social cycle theory
World Pantheist Movement

References

Citations

Sources

Further reading

External links 
 The forgotten history of atheist paganism
 Humanist common ground: Paganism
 Being atheist in the pagan community: What to expect
 “Atheist pagan” does not equal “secular pagan”
 Pagan atheists: Yes, we exist

Paganism
Modern paganism and society
Secularism